Todd Andrew Bankhead (born June 6, 1977) is a former American football quarterback who played two seasons in the Arena Football League with the New Jersey Gladiators and Georgia Force. He first enrolled at Palomar College before transferring to the University of Massachusetts Amherst. He attended Orange Glen High School in Escondido, California. Bankhead was also a member of the Hamilton Tiger-Cats of the Canadian Football League.

Early years
Bankhead played high school football for the Orange Glen High School Patriots. He recorded 2,400 passing yards during his high school career and was team captain his senior year. He also played basketball for the Patriots and was a member of National Honor Society.

College career

Palomar College
Bankhead played his first two season of college football for the Palomar Comets. He completed 47 of 84 passes for 703 yards with three touchdowns his sophomore year  completed 73 of 153 for 1,010 yards with six touchdowns as a freshman.

University of Massachusetts Amherst
Bankhead played his final two season of college football for the UMass Minutemen. He recorded career totals of 7,018 yards passing, 561 completions, 51 touchdown passes, 931 attempts and 6,821 yards of total offense for the Minutemen. He set single-season records in his junior season with 3,919 yards passing, 303 completions, 34 touchdown passes, an average of 261.3 yards passing per game, 3,756 yards of total offense and 525 attempts. Bankhead helped the Minutemen to their victory in the 1998 NCAA Division I-AA Football Championship Game. He established a school record with a 63.5 percent completion ratio when he had 258 completions in 406 attempts for 3,099 yards and 17 touchdowns during his senior year. He received second-team All-Atlantic 10 Conference honors as a junior and senior.

Professional career
Bankhead signed with the Hamilton Tiger-Cats on June 15, 2000. He was released by the Tiger-Cats in December 2000. He played with the New Jersey Gladiators during the 2001 Arena Football League season. Bankhead was signed by the Georgia Force on December 28, 2002.

References

External links
Just Sports Stats

Living people
1977 births
Players of American football from San Diego
American football quarterbacks
Canadian football quarterbacks
UMass Minutemen football players
Hamilton Tiger-Cats players
New Jersey Gladiators players
Georgia Force players
Players of Canadian football from San Diego
Palomar Comets football players